Black Atlantic (2004) is an original novel written by Simon Jowett and Peter J. Evans, based on the long-running British science fiction comic strip Judge Dredd.

Synopsis
Judge Dredd must find and destroy an illegal "bioweapon" – a deadly creature created in a laboratory and designed to kill everyone it sees – which has been stolen and is being held somewhere on a massive city-ship full of mutants, in the highly toxic Atlantic Ocean.

External links
Black Atlantic at the 2000 AD website.

2004 novels
Judge Dredd novels
Novels set in the 22nd century